Tomás Eduardo Rincón Hernández (born 13 January 1988) is a Venezuelan professional footballer who plays as a defensive midfielder or full-back for Italian  club Sampdoria and the Venezuela national team, which he captains.

Club career

Early career
Rincón began his career at UA Maracaibo. Then he joined Zamora in January 2007, playing 33 games and scoring one goal, up to July 2008. In July 2008, Rincón joined Deportivo Táchira and signed a contract up to 2010.

Hamburger SV
The 22-year-old midfielder played on loan at German Bundesliga side Hamburger SV. On 30 January 2009, he signed a contract until 31 December 2009. Rincón played his first match for Hamburg on 4 March 2009 against Wehen Wiesbaden in the DFB-Pokal.

He debuted in the Bundesliga on 4 April 2009 as a substitute in the 87th minute in a 1–0 win against 1899 Hoffenheim. On 10 December 2009, Hamburger SV purchased him from his former club Deportivo Táchira. Rincón signed a contract until 30 June 2014.

Genoa

On 31 July 2014 Rincón was signed by Italian club Genoa on a free transfer, and on 24 August, he played his first official match with the Gialloblu in an away game, valid for the third qualifying round of the Coppa Italia, won 1–0 against Lanciano. He made his debut in Serie A on 31 August against Napoli. With Genoa he finished in 6th place, qualifying for the Europa League, but was denied because Genoa failed to obtain a UEFA license.

The next season Rincón made his debut in the league in the second round, in a home game won 2–0 against Hellas Verona. On 22 November 2015 he scored his first goal for Genoa in the game won against Sassuolo. Overall, he made 83 appearances and scored 3 goals with Genoa.

Juventus

In the middle of the 2016–17 season, Rincón was linked with a move to defending Serie A champions Juventus during the January transfer window; he ultimately signed a three-and-a-half-year deal with the Turin-based club on 3 January 2017 for a reported fee of €8 million, becoming the first Venezuelan ever to represent the Bianconeri, and was given the number 28 shirt. He made his debut for the Turin side on 8 January, coming on as a substitute for Sami Khedira in a 3–0 home win over Bologna, in Serie A. On 14 March, he made his UEFA Champions League debut with the club, coming on as a substitute for Paulo Dybala, in a 1–0 home win over Porto, in the second leg of the round of 16.

Torino
On 11 August 2017, Rincón was loaned to Torino for the 2017–18 season for €3 million, with a €6 million conditional obligation to buy. After the player had reached the condition on appearance for Torino, the club bought him outright on 6 January 2018. The deal was officially confirmed by Juventus on 5 February.

Sampdoria
On 8 January 2022, he joined Sampdoria on loan. On 5 July 2022, Rincón returned to Sampdoria on a permanent basis with a one-year contract.

International career

Rincón played for the Venezuela national under-20 team at Sudamericana sub-20, held in Paraguay. He played his first senior international game for Venezuela in 2008 in a 2010 FIFA World Cup qualifier. On 22 July 2011, he was voted Adidas' Best Player at the 2011 Copa América, held in Argentina, receiving 65% of the total votes against ten candidates. Venezuela finished the tournament in fourth place. He later also took part at the 2015 Copa América, and the Copa América Centenario in 2016 with Venezuela, serving as his team's captain in the latter tournament. He scored his first international goal on 16 November 2018, netting the equalising goal from the penalty spot in a 1–1 friendly away draw against Japan. He was also a member of the Venezuelan team that took part at the 2019 Copa América in Brazil. On 14 October 2019, Rincón made his 100th international appearance for Venezuela against Trinidad and Tobago.

Style of play
Nicknamed el general (The General, in Spanish), Rincón is quick, physical, versatile, and hard-working player, who is capable of playing in several midfield and defensive positions. Although he is usually deployed in the centre, as a defensive midfielder in front of the back-line, he is also capable of playing as a full-back, wing-back, or wide midfielder along the right flank. He has even been deployed in a box-to-box role, or as an offensive-minded central midfielder on occasion, known as the mezzala role in Italy. A strong, tenacious, and well-rounded footballer, with solid technique, a powerful shot, and an ability to provide assists for his teammates, he is mainly known for his anticipation, tactical intelligence, energy, and ball-winning abilities, as well as his strong personality, tenacity, dedication, professionalism, strength of character, and leadership.

Career statistics

Club

International

International goals
Scores and results list Venezuela's goal tally first.

Honours

Club
Juventus
Serie A: 2016–17
Coppa Italia: 2016–17

National
Venezuela
Kirin Cup: 2019
Copa América 4th place (copper medal): 2011

Individual
Adidas' Best Player of the 2011 Copa América

See also
 List of footballers with 100 or more caps

References

External links

 
 
  
 
 Tomás Rincón at kicker.de 

1988 births
Living people
People from San Cristóbal, Táchira
Association football midfielders
Venezuelan footballers
Venezuela international footballers
Zamora FC players
Hamburger SV players
Deportivo Táchira F.C. players
Genoa C.F.C. players
Bundesliga players
Serie A players
Venezuelan expatriate footballers
Expatriate footballers in Germany
Expatriate footballers in Italy
2011 Copa América players
2015 Copa América players
Copa América Centenario players
Juventus F.C. players
Torino F.C. players
U.C. Sampdoria players
Venezuelan expatriate sportspeople in Germany
Venezuelan expatriate sportspeople in Italy
2019 Copa América players
FIFA Century Club
Central American and Caribbean Games medalists in football
Central American and Caribbean Games silver medalists for Venezuela
Competitors at the 2006 Central American and Caribbean Games